The Godfather III is the thirteenth studio album by English grime MC Wiley. It was originally scheduled for release on 12 September 2019 under CTA Records, but was delayed to 5 June 2020.

Critical reception
The Godfather III was met with "generally favorable" reviews from critics. At Metacritic, which assigns a weighted average rating out of 100 to reviews from mainstream publications, this release received an average score of 79, based on 7 reviews.

Track listing
Track listing adapted from Genius

Charts

References

2020 albums
Wiley (musician) albums